The World Group Play-offs were four ties which involved the losing nations of the tennis World Group first round and the winning nations of the World Group II. Nations that won their play-off ties entered the 1998 World Group, while losing nations joined the 1998 World Group II.

Australia vs. Spain

Switzerland vs. Argentina

Germany vs. Croatia

United States vs. Japan

References

See also
Fed Cup structure

World Group Play-offs